Robert Birkenshaw (also Bekensall and Bekensaw) D.D. (d. 1526) was a Canon of Windsor from 1512 - 1525

Career

He was appointed:
President of Queen's College, Cambridge 1508 - 1519
Rector of Revesby, Lincolnshire until 1505
Vicar of Croxton 1505
Rector of St Michael the Archangel's Church, Chagford, Devon 1510
Rector of Bradwell-super-Mare, Essex 1512
Treasurer of Lincoln 1513
Chaplain and Almoner to Catherine of Aragon
Dean of Stoke-by-Clare 1517
Prebendary of Lincoln 1523

He was appointed to the first stall in St George's Chapel, Windsor Castle in 1512, and held the stall until 1525.

Notes 

1526 deaths
Canons of Windsor
Presidents of Queens' College, Cambridge
Year of birth missing